This is a list of butterflies of Ethiopia. About 376 species are known from Ethiopia, 33 of which are endemic.

Papilionidae

Papilioninae

Papilionini
Papilio nireus pseudonireus Felder & Felder, 1865
Papilio wilsoni Rothschild, 1926
Papilio arnoldiana Vane-Wright, 1995
Papilio dardanus antinorii Oberthür, 1883
Papilio constantinus Ward, 1871
Papilio rex abyssinicana Vane-Wright, 1995
Papilio rex franciscae Carpenter, 1928
Papilio echerioides leucospilus Rothschild, 1902
Papilio echerioides oscari Rothschild, 1902
Papilio microps Storace, 1952

Leptocercini
Graphium antheus (Cramer, 1779)
Graphium colonna (Ward, 1873)
Graphium angolanus baronis (Ungemach, 1932)
Graphium leonidas (Fabricius, 1793)
Graphium philonoe whalleyi (Talbot, 1929)
Graphium almansor birbiri (Ungemach, 1932)

Pieridae

Pseudopontiinae
Pseudopontia mabira Mitter & Collins, 2010

Coliadinae
Eurema brigitta (Stoll, [1780])
Eurema desjardinsii marshalli (Butler, 1898)
Eurema regularis (Butler, 1876)
Eurema hecabe solifera (Butler, 1875)
Catopsilia florella (Fabricius, 1775)
Colias electo meneliki Berger, 1940
Colias electo pseudohecate Berger, 1940
Colias marnoana Rogenhofer, 1884

Pierinae
Colotis antevippe zera (Lucas, 1852)
Colotis aurora evarne (Klug, 1829)
Colotis celimene celimene (Lucas, 1852)
Colotis celimene praeclarus (Butler, 1886)
Colotis chrysonome (Klug, 1829)
Colotis daira stygia (Felder & Felder, 1865)
Colotis danae eupompe (Klug, 1829)
Colotis danae pseudacaste (Butler, 1876)
Colotis euippe exole (Reiche, 1850)
Colotis evenina casta (Gerstaecker, 1871)
Colotis halimede halimede (Klug, 1829)
Colotis halimede restricta Talbot, 1939
Colotis hetaera aspasia (Ungemach, 1932)
Colotis hetaera lorti (Sharpe, 1896)
Colotis liagore (Klug, 1829)
Colotis phisadia phisadia (Godart, 1819)
Colotis phisadia ocellatus (Butler, 1886)
Colotis pleione heliocaustus (Butler, 1886)
Colotis protomedia (Klug, 1829)
Colotis rogersi (Dixey, 1915)
Colotis ungemachi (Le Cerf, 1922)
Colotis venosa (Staudinger, 1885)
Colotis vesta (Reiche, 1850)
Colotis vestalis castalis (Staudinger, 1884)
Colotis agoye zephyrus (Marshall, 1897)
Eronia cleodora Hübner, 1823
Eronia leda (Boisduval, 1847)
Pinacopterix eriphia melanarge (Butler, 1886)
Pinacopterix eriphia tritogenia (Klug, 1829)
Nepheronia buquetii (Boisduval, 1836)
Nepheronia thalassina sinalata (Suffert, 1904)
Euchloe belemia abyssinica Riley, 1928
Leptosia alcesta inalcesta Bernardi, 1959
Leptosia alcesta pseudonuptilla Bernardi, 1959

Pierini
Appias epaphia contracta (Butler, 1888)
Appias phaola intermedia Dufrane, 1948
Appias sabina (Felder & Felder, [1865])
Appias sylvia abyssinica Talbot, 1932
Pieris brassicoides Guérin-Méneville, 1848
Pontia daplidice aethiops (de Joannis & Verity, 1913)
Pontia distorta (Butler, 1886)
Pontia glauconome Klug, 1829
Mylothris agathina (Cramer, 1779)
Mylothris erlangeri Pagenstecher, 1902
Mylothris jacksoni nagichota Talbot, 1944
Mylothris mortoni mortoni Blachier, 1912
Mylothris mortoni balkis Ungemach, 1932
Mylothris rubricosta (Mabille, 1890)
Mylothris rueppellii (Koch, 1865)
Mylothris sagala swaynei Butler, 1899
Mylothris yulei amhara Ungemach, 1932
Dixeia charina septentrionalis Bernardi, 1958
Dixeia dixeyi (Neave, 1904)
Dixeia doxo venatus (Butler, 1871)
Dixeia orbona vidua (Butler, 1900)
Dixeia pigea (Boisduval, 1836)
Belenois aurota (Fabricius, 1793)
Belenois creona creona (Cramer, [1776])
Belenois creona boguensis (Felder & Felder, 1865)
Belenois gidica abyssinica (Lucas, 1852)
Belenois gidica hypoxantha (Ungemach, 1932)
Belenois raffrayi (Oberthür, 1878)
Belenois solilucis loveni (Aurivillius, 1921)
Belenois subeida hailo (Ungemach, 1932)
Belenois thysa tricolor Talbot, 1943
Belenois zochalia galla (Ungemach, 1932)

Lycaenidae

Miletinae

Miletini
Spalgis lemolea Druce, 1890
Lachnocnema abyssinica Libert, 1996
Lachnocnema emperamus (Snellen, 1872)
Lachnocnema divergens Gaede, 1915

Poritiinae

Liptenini
Alaena johanna Sharpe, 1890
Pentila pauli ras Talbot, 1935

Aphnaeinae
Chloroselas esmeralda Butler, 1886
Chloroselas pseudozeritis (Trimen, 1873)
Cigaritis avriko (Karsch, 1893)
Cigaritis somalina (Butler, 1886)
Axiocerses harpax kadugli Talbot, 1935
Axiocerses amanga (Westwood, 1881)
Axiocerses maureli Dufrane, 1954
Axiocerses argenteomaculata Pagenstecher, 1902
Axiocerses jacksoni Stempffer, 1948

Theclinae
Myrina silenus nzoiae d'Abrera, 1980
Hypolycaena ogadenensis Stempffer, 1946
Hypolycaena philippus (Fabricius, 1793)
Leptomyrina boschi Strand, 1911
Iolaus diametra (Karsch, 1895)
Iolaus glaucus Butler, 1886
Iolaus jacksoni (Stempffer, 1950)
Iolaus mimosae berbera (Bethune-Baker, 1924)
Iolaus tajoraca Walker, 1870
Iolaus sudanicus Aurivillius, 1905
Iolaus menas Druce, 1890
Iolaus ismenias piaggiae Oberthür, 1883
Iolaus crawshayi maureli Dufrane, 1954
Stugeta bowkeri ethiopica Stempffer & Bennett, 1958
Pilodeudorix obscurata (Trimen, 1891)
Deudorix dinochares Grose-Smith, 1887
Deudorix lorisona baronica Ungemach, 1932

Polyommatinae

Lycaenesthini
Anthene amarah (Guérin-Méneville, 1849)
Anthene aurobrunnea (Ungemach, 1932)
Anthene butleri butleri (Oberthür, 1880)
Anthene butleri galla Stempffer, 1947
Anthene collinsi d'Abrera, 1980
Anthene contrastata (Ungemach, 1932)
Anthene crawshayi minuta (Bethune-Baker, 1916)
Anthene definita nigrocaudata (Pagenstecher, 1902)
Anthene hodsoni (Talbot, 1935)
Anthene indefinita (Bethune-Baker, 1910)
Anthene janna Gabriel, 1949
Anthene kersteni (Gerstaecker, 1871)
Anthene opalina Stempffer, 1946
Anthene otacilia dulcis (Pagenstecher, 1902)
Anthene pitmani Stempffer, 1936
Anthene princeps (Butler, 1876)
Anthene rothschildi (Aurivillius, 1922)
Anthene saddacus (Talbot, 1935)
Anthene schoutedeni (Hulstaert, 1924)
Anthene suquala (Pagenstecher, 1902)
Anthene wilsoni (Talbot, 1935)
Anthene gemmifera (Neave, 1910)
Lycaena phlaeas pseudophlaeas (Lucas, 1866)

Polyommatini
Cupidopsis jobates mauritanica Riley, 1932
Lampides boeticus (Linnaeus, 1767)
Uranothauma antinorii (Oberthür, 1883)
Uranothauma delatorum Heron, 1909
Uranothauma nubifer distinctesignatus (Strand, 1911)
Cacyreus ethiopicus Tite, 1961
Cacyreus tespis ghimirra Talbot, 1935
Tuxentius cretosus (Butler, 1876)
Tuxentius kaffana (Talbot, 1935)
Tuxentius melaena (Trimen & Bowker, 1887)
Tarucus grammicus (Grose-Smith & Kirby, 1893)
Tarucus rosacea (Austaut, 1885)
Tarucus theophrastus (Fabricius, 1793)
Tarucus ungemachi Stempffer, 1942
Zintha hintza resplendens (Butler, 1876)
Actizera stellata (Trimen, 1883)
Azanus jesous (Guérin-Méneville, 1849)
Azanus natalensis (Trimen & Bowker, 1887)
Azanus isis (Drury, 1773)
Eicochrysops antoto (Strand, 1911)
Eicochrysops distractus (de Joannis & Verity, 1913)
Eicochrysops masai (Bethune-Baker, 1905)
Eicochrysops meryamae Rougeot, 1983
Eicochrysops messapus sebagadis (Guérin-Méneville, 1849)
Euchrysops abyssinica (Aurivillius, 1922)
Euchrysops albistriata (Capronnier, 1889)
Euchrysops brunneus Bethune-Baker, 1923
Euchrysops cyclopteris (Butler, 1876)
Euchrysops mauensis abyssiniae Storace, 1950
Euchrysops nandensis (Neave, 1904)
Euchrysops nilotica (Aurivillius, 1904)
Euchrysops reducta Hulstaert, 1924
Euchrysops severini Hulstaert, 1924
Thermoniphas colorata (Ungemach, 1932)
Chilades elicola (Strand, 1911)
Chilades naidina (Butler, 1886)
Lepidochrysops lunulifer (Ungemach, 1932)
Lepidochrysops fumosa (Butler, 1886)
Lepidochrysops guichardi Gabriel, 1949
Lepidochrysops loveni abyssiniensis (Strand, 1911)
Lepidochrysops loveni oculus (Ungemach, 1932)
Lepidochrysops negus (Felder & Felder, [1865])
Lepidochrysops pterou lilacina (Ungemach, 1932)
Lepidochrysops subvariegata Talbot, 1935

Nymphalidae

Libytheinae
Libythea labdaca laius Trimen, 1879

Danainae

Danaini
Danaus chrysippus chrysippus (Linnaeus, 1758)
Danaus chrysippus alcippus (Cramer, 1777)
Danaus dorippus (Klug, 1845)
Tirumala formosa neumanni (Rothschild, 1902)
Tirumala petiverana (Doubleday, 1847)
Amauris niavius aethiops Rothschild & Jordan, 1903
Amauris albimaculata sudanica Talbot, 1940
Amauris echeria abessinica Schmidt, 1921
Amauris echeria steckeri Kheil, 1890
Amauris hecate stictica Rothschild & Jordan, 1903
Amauris ochlea darius Rothschild & Jordan, 1903
Amauris ochleides Staudinger, 1896

Satyrinae

Melanitini
Gnophodes betsimena parmeno Doubleday, 1849
Melanitis libya Distant, 1882

Satyrini
Lasiommata maderakal (Guérin-Méneville, 1849)
Bicyclus angulosa (Butler, 1868)
Bicyclus anynana (Butler, 1879)
Bicyclus campus (Karsch, 1893)
Bicyclus milyas (Hewitson, 1864)
Bicyclus pavonis (Butler, 1876)
Bicyclus safitza safitza (Westwood, 1850)
Bicyclus safitza aethiops (Rothschild & Jordan, 1905)
Bicyclus sandace (Hewitson, 1877)
Bicyclus vulgaris (Butler, 1868)
Heteropsis perspicua (Trimen, 1873)
Ypthima asterope (Klug, 1832)
Ypthima condamini Kielland, 1982
Ypthima impura paupera Ungemach, 1932
Ypthima jacksoni Kielland, 1982
Ypthima pupillaris obscurata Kielland, 1982
Ypthima simplicia Butler, 1876
Ypthima yatta Kielland, 1982
Ypthimomorpha itonia (Hewitson, 1865)
Neocoenyra duplex Butler, 1886

Charaxinae

Charaxini
Charaxes varanes vologeses (Mabille, 1876)
Charaxes candiope (Godart, 1824)
Charaxes boueti rectans Rothschild & Jordan, 1903
Charaxes lactetinctus ungemachi Le Cerf, 1927
Charaxes jasius Poulton, 1926
Charaxes epijasius Reiche, 1850
Charaxes jasius pagenstecheri Poulton, 1926
Charaxes hansali hansali Felder, 1867
Charaxes hansali baringana Rothschild, 1905
Charaxes hansali kulalae van Someren, 1975
Charaxes castor (Cramer, 1775)
Charaxes junius junius Oberthür, 1880
Charaxes julius somalicus Rothschild, 1900
Charaxes phoebus Butler, 1866
Charaxes numenes neumanni Rothschild, 1902
Charaxes tiridates marginatus Rothschild & Jordan, 1903
Charaxes pythodoris Hewitson, 1873
Charaxes etesipe abyssinicus Rothschild, 1900
Charaxes achaemenes monticola van Someren, 1970
Charaxes jahlusa ganalensis Carpenter, 1937
Charaxes etheocles carpenteri van Someren & Jackson, 1957
Charaxes galawadiwosi Plantrou & Rougeot, 1979
Charaxes chanleri Holland, 1896
Charaxes kirki daria Rothschild, 1903
Charaxes figini van Someren, 1969
Charaxes larseni Rydon, 1982
Charaxes sidamo Plantrou & Rougeot, 1979
Charaxes zoolina (Westwood, [1850])

Euxanthini
Charaxes eurinome birbirica Ungemach, 1932

Nymphalinae

Nymphalini
Antanartia schaeneia diluta Rothschild & Jordan, 1903
Vanessa dimorphica dimorphica (Howarth, 1966)
Vanessa dimorphica aethiopica (Howarth, 1966)
Vanessa abyssinica (Felder & Felder, 1867)
Junonia chorimene (Guérin-Méneville, 1844)
Junonia oenone (Linnaeus, 1758)
Junonia sophia infracta Butler, 1888
Junonia terea fumata (Rothschild & Jordan, 1903)
Junonia westermanni Westwood, 1870
Junonia ansorgei (Rothschild, 1899)
Salamis cacta (Fabricius, 1793)
Protogoniomorpha anacardii nebulosa (Trimen, 1881)
Protogoniomorpha parhassus (Drury, 1782)
Protogoniomorpha temora (Felder & Felder, 1867)
Precis ceryne (Boisduval, 1847)
Precis coelestina Dewitz, 1879
Precis limnoria limnoria (Klug, 1845)
Precis limnoria taveta Rogenhofer, 1891
Precis octavia (Cramer, 1777)
Precis pelarga (Fabricius, 1775)
Precis tugela aurorina (Butler, 1894)
Hypolimnas anthedon wahlbergi (Wallengren, 1857)
Hypolimnas misippus (Linnaeus, 1764)
Hypolimnas salmacis platydema Rothschild & Jordan, 1903
Melitaea abyssinica Oberthür, 1909

Cyrestinae

Cyrestini
Cyrestis camillus (Fabricius, 1781)

Biblidinae

Biblidini
Byblia anvatara acheloia (Wallengren, 1857)
Byblia ilithyia (Drury, 1773)
Neptidopsis ophione nucleata Grünberg, 1911
Eurytela dryope angulata Aurivillius, 1899
Eurytela hiarbas abyssinica Rothschild & Jordan, 1903

Epicaliini
Sevenia boisduvali kaffana (Rothschild & Jordan, 1903)
Sevenia garega (Karsch, 1892)
Sevenia occidentalium (Mabille, 1876)
Sevenia umbrina (Karsch, 1892)

Limenitinae

Limenitidini
Pseudacraea boisduvalii sayonis Ungemach, 1932
Pseudacraea eurytus mimoras Ungemach, 1932
Pseudacraea lucretia walensensis (Sharpe, 1896)

Neptidini
Neptis agouale parallela Collins & Larsen, 1996
Neptis laeta Overlaet, 1955
Neptis saclava marpessa Hopffer, 1855
Neptis serena Overlaet, 1955

Adoliadini
Aterica galene incisa Rothschild & Jordan, 1903
Euphaedra medon abouna Ungemach, 1932
Euphaedra caerulescens submarginalis Hecq, 1997
Euphaedra sarita abyssinica Rothschild, 1902
Euphaedra neumanni Rothschild, 1902
Euphaedra castanoides deficiens Hecq, 1997

Heliconiinae

Acraeini
Acraea chilo Godman, 1880
Acraea endoscota Le Doux, 1928
Acraea insignis Distant, 1880
Acraea neobule Doubleday, 1847
Acraea oscari Rothschild, 1902
Acraea pseudolycia astrigera Butler, 1899
Acraea quirina rosa Eltringham, 1912
Acraea sidamona Rothschild & Jordan, 1905
Acraea egina (Cramer, 1775)
Acraea braesia Godman, 1885
Acraea caecilia (Fabricius, 1781)
Acraea caldarena Hewitson, 1877
Acraea doubledayi Guérin-Méneville, 1849
Acraea mirabilis Butler, 1886
Acraea miranda Riley, 1920
Acraea oncaea Hopffer, 1855
Acraea pseudegina Westwood, 1852
Acraea zoumi Pierre, 1995
Acraea aganice orientalis (Ungemach, 1932)
Acraea alcinoe nado (Ungemach, 1932)
Acraea epaea homochroa (Rothschild & Jordan, 1905)
Acraea poggei ras (Ungemach, 1932)
Acraea aurivillii schecana Rothschild & Jordan, 1905
Acraea bonasia banka Eltringham, 1912
Acraea encedana Pierre, 1976
Acraea serena (Fabricius, 1775)
Acraea iturina kakana Eltringham, 1911
Acraea jodutta aethiops Rothschild & Jordan, 1905
Acraea johnstoni Godman, 1885
Acraea lycoa Godart, 1819
Acraea necoda Hewitson, 1861
Acraea peneleos gelonica Rothschild & Jordan, 1905
Acraea pharsalus rhodina Rothschild, 1902
Acraea rangatana maji Carpenter, 1935
Acraea sotikensis Sharpe, 1892
Acraea ventura ochrascens Sharpe, 1902
Acraea guichardi Gabriel, 1949
Acraea cinerea Neave, 1904
Acraea orinata Oberthür, 1893
Acraea parrhasia servona Godart, 1819
Acraea perenna kaffana Rothschild, 1902
Acraea safie safie Felder & Felder, 1865
Acraea safie antinorii Oberthür, 1880
Acraea ungemachi Le Cerf, 1927

Argynnini
Argynnis hyperbius neumanni Rothschild, 1902

Vagrantini
Phalanta eurytis eurytis (Doubleday, 1847)
Phalanta eurytis microps (Rothschild & Jordan, 1903)
Phalanta phalantha aethiopica (Rothschild & Jordan, 1903)

Hesperiidae

Coeliadinae
Coeliades anchises (Gerstaecker, 1871)
Coeliades chalybe immaculata Carpenter, 1935
Coeliades forestan (Stoll, [1782])
Coeliades keithloa menelik (Ungemach, 1932)
Coeliades pisistratus (Fabricius, 1793)

Pyrginae

Celaenorrhinini
Eretis lugens (Rogenhofer, 1891)
Eretis mixta Evans, 1937
Sarangesa laelius (Mabille, 1877)
Sarangesa lucidella helena Evans, 1947
Sarangesa motozi (Wallengren, 1857)
Sarangesa phidyle (Walker, 1870)

Tagiadini
Eagris denuba obliterata Carpenter, 1928
Eagris nottoana (Wallengren, 1857)
Caprona adelica Karsch, 1892
Caprona pillaana Wallengren, 1857
Leucochitonea hindei Druce, 1903
Abantis meneliki Berger, 1979

Carcharodini
Spialia colotes semiconfluens de Jong, 1978
Spialia mafa higginsi Evans, 1937
Spialia mangana (Rebel, 1899)
Spialia zebra bifida (Higgins, 1924)

Hesperiinae

Aeromachini
Prosopalpus debilis (Plötz, 1879)
Kedestes callicles (Hewitson, 1868)
Acleros mackenii instabilis Mabille, 1890
Chondrolepis niveicornis pseudonero Berger, 1984
Zophopetes dysmephila (Trimen, 1868)
Artitropa reducta Aurivillius, 1925

Baorini
Zenonia zeno (Trimen, 1864)
Borbo perobscura (Druce, 1912)
Gegenes hottentota (Latreille, 1824)

Heteropterinae
Metisella formosus mittoni Carcasson, 1961
Metisella tsadicus (Aurivillius, 1905)

See also
List of ecoregions in Ethiopia
Geography of Ethiopia

References

Seitz, A. Die Gross-Schmetterlinge der Erde 13: Die Afrikanischen Tagfalter. Plates
Seitz, A. Die Gross-Schmetterlinge der Erde 13: Die Afrikanischen Tagfalter. Text 

Butterflies
Ethiop
Ethiopia
Ethiopia
Butterflies